Anthony Duncan Strachan (born 7 June 1966) is a former New Zealand rugby union player. A halfback, Strachan represented Otago, Auckland and North Harbour at a provincial level, and was a member of the New Zealand national side, the All Blacks, between 1992 and 1995. He played 17 matches for the All Blacks including 11 internationals.

References

1966 births
Living people
People from Te Awamutu
People educated at Auckland Grammar School
University of Otago alumni
New Zealand rugby union players
New Zealand international rugby union players
Otago rugby union players
Auckland rugby union players
North Harbour rugby union players
Rugby union scrum-halves
New Zealand expatriate sportspeople in Japan
Expatriate rugby union players in Japan
Rugby union players from Waikato